The National Construction Movement, sometimes translated as the Movement for National Construction, is an Algerian political party.

History 
The party was founded in March 2013 by Abdelkader Bengrina, a former member of the Movement of Society for Peace, who left the party in 2008, alongside other dissidents. The party was officially accredited by the government the following year.

Electoral history

Presidential elections

People's National Assembly elections

References 

Political parties in Algeria
Algerian nationalism
Political parties established in 2018
2018 establishments in Algeria
Islamic political parties in Algeria